today is a large artificial island in Tokyo Bay, Japan, across the Rainbow Bridge from central Tokyo. Odaiba was initially built in this area for defensive purposes in the 1850s. Reclaimed land offshore Shinagawa was dramatically expanded during the late 20th century as a seaport district, and has developed since the 1990s as a major commercial, residential and leisure area. Odaiba, along with Minato Mirai 21 in Yokohama, is among a few manmade seashores in Tokyo Bay where the waterfront is accessible, and not blocked by industry and harbor areas. For artificial sand beaches in the bay, Sea Park in Kanazawa-ku is suitable for swimming, Odaiba has one, and there are two in Kasai Rinkai Park area looking over to the Tokyo Disneyland.

 formally refers to one district of the island development in Minato Ward. Governor Shintaro Ishihara used Odaiba to refer to the entire , which includes the Ariake and Aomi districts of Kōtō Ward and the Higashi-Yashio district of Shinagawa Ward.

History

Battery islands 

They were constructed in 1853 by Egawa Hidetatsu for the Tokugawa shogunate in order to protect Edo from attack by sea, the primary threat being Commodore Matthew Perry's Black Ships, which had arrived in the same year.

Of the originally planned 11 batteries, seven construction projects started, but only six were ever finished. No. 1 to No. 3 Batteries were completed in eight months in 1853. Construction on Nos. 4 to 7 started in 1854, but only Nos. 5 and 6 were finished by the year's end. Nos. 4 and 7 were abandoned, with 30% and 70% unfinished (respectively), and an alternative land-based battery near Gotenyama was built instead. However, they resumed construction on No. 4 in 1862 and completed it the following year.

Until the mid-1960s, all except two batteries (Nos. 3 and 6) were either removed to facilitate ship navigation or incorporated into Shinagawa port and Tennōzu. In 1979, the "landfill no. 13" (now Minato-ku Daiba, Shinagawa-ku Higashi-Yashio and Kōtō-ku Aomi districts) was finished and connected to the park that was No. 3 Battery. On the other hand, No. 6 was left to nature (access prohibited).

Redevelopment 

The modern island of Odaiba began to take shape when the Port of Tokyo opened in 1941.

Tokyo governor Shunichi Suzuki began a major development plan in the early 1990s to redevelop Odaiba as Tokyo Teleport Town, a showcase for futuristic living, with new residential and commercial development housing a population of over 100,000. The redevelopment was scheduled to be complete in time for a planned "International Urban Exposition" in spring 1996.

Suzuki's successor Yukio Aoshima halted the plan in 1995, by which point over JPY 1 trillion had been spent on the project, and Odaiba was still underpopulated and full of vacant lots. Many of the special companies set up to develop the island became practically bankrupt. The collapse of the Japanese asset price bubble was a major factor, as it frustrated commercial development in Tokyo generally. The area was also viewed as inconvenient for business, as its physical connections to Tokyo—the Rainbow Bridge and the Yurikamome rapid transit line—made travel to and from central Tokyo relatively time-consuming and costly.

The area started coming back to life in the late 1990s as a tourist and leisure zone, with several large hotels and shopping malls. Several large companies including Fuji Television moved their headquarters to the island, and transportation links improved with the connection of the Rinkai Line into the JR East railway network in 2002 and the eastward extension of the Yurikamome to Toyosu in 2006. Tokyo Big Sight, the convention center originally built to house Governor Suzuki's planned intercity convention, also became a major venue for international expositions.

The D1 Grand Prix motorsport series hosted drifting events at Odaiba from 2004 to 2018.

Odaiba was one of the venues for the 2020 Summer Olympics. The events to be held there included beach volleyball at Shiokaze Park, triathlon and marathon swimming at Odaiba Marine Park, and gymnastics at a new gymnastics venue.

Attractions 
Today's Odaiba is a popular shopping and sightseeing destination for Tokyoites and tourists alike. Major attractions include:

 Palette Town, including Daikanransha (Ferris wheel), the Toyota exhibition hall called Megaweb, MORI Building Digital Art Museum, Tokyo Leisure Land, a Venice-themed shopping mall called VenusFort, and Zepp Tokyo
 Fuji Television headquarters, with a distinctive building designed by Kenzo Tange
 Miraikan, Japan's National Museum of Emerging Science and Innovation
 Rainbow Bridge, connecting Odaiba to the heart of Tokyo
 Tokyo Big Sight (Tokyo International Exhibition Center)
 Aqua City, a shopping center featuring a chapel, Toys "R" Us and 13-screen United Cinemas
 DiverCity Tokyo Plaza, a shopping center containing Unko Museum Tokyo, the world's first Doraemon Future Department Store (ドラえもん未来デパート), and
 Gundam Base Tokyo, featuring a 19.7-meter (64.6 feet) tall statue of Gundam
 another Zepp location (Zepp DiverCity)
 Decks Tokyo Beach shopping mall, featuring Sega Joypolis, Odaiba Takoyaki Museum, Madame Tussauds and Legoland Discovery Center
Museum of Maritime Science (Fune no kagakukan), with swimming pool
 Shiokaze park with BBQ places and Higashi Yashio park
 Telecom Center Building (MXTV's former headquarters), with observation deck
 One of two beaches in urban Tokyo (swimming prohibited), along with Kasai Rinkai Park in Edogawa Ward
 A replica of the Statue of Liberty
 Panasonic Center, a science and technology showroom
 Sea Forest Waterway, the regatta venue for rowing and canoeing at the 2020 Summer Olympic Games

Transport 

Two Shuto Expressway lines access Odaiba: Route 11 enters from central Tokyo crossing the Rainbow Bridge, while the Bayshore Route enters from Shinagawa Ward through the Tokyo Port Tunnel and from the bayfront areas of Tokyo and Chiba Prefecture to the east.

By public transport, Odaiba is accessible via the automated Yurikamome transit system from Shimbashi and Toyosu. The privately operated Rinkai Line runs between Shin-kiba and Osaki, but many trains connect directly to Shibuya, Shinjuku, and Ikebukuro. City buses provide cheaper if slower access. Ferries connect Odaiba with Asakusa running along the Sumida River and the Kasai Rinkai Park in eastern Tokyo.

The Tokyo Cruise Ship is a water bus operator in Tokyo that offers services including public lines as well as event cruises and chartered ships. Such as from Asakusa → Odaiba Seaside Park → Toyosu → Asakusa.

Cultural references 
Odaiba, the Rainbow Bridge, and other parts of the surrounding area are a major setting of the Digimon Adventure franchise. The area is noted in many major areas of the plot.

Odaiba serves as the main setting for the multimedia project Love Live! Nijigasaki High School Idol Club, in which the Tokyo Big Sight building serves as the Nijigasaki High School ((虹ヶ咲学園, Nijigasaki Gakuen). Diver City, Sega Joypolis and the Rainbow Bridge can be seen as settings in the animation.

Education

Minato City Board of Education operates public elementary and junior high schools. Daiba 1-2 chōme 1-5-ban are zoned to Odaiba Gakuen (お台場学園) for elementary and junior high school.

References

External links

 Area Guide of Odaiba with sightseeing spots
 historical map from 1892 (in Japanese)

 
Odaiba Youth Park
Artificial islands of Tokyo
Artificial islands of Japan
Tokyo Bay
Geography of Minato, Tokyo
Neighborhoods of Tokyo
Redeveloped ports and waterfronts in Japan
Bakumatsu
Islands of Tokyo
Sports venues in Tokyo